The Mississippi Surge were a professional hockey team in the Southern Professional Hockey League that began play in the 2009–10 season and folded on May 2, 2014. Playing for five seasons, the Surge was based in Biloxi and home games were played at the Mississippi Coast Coliseum, also known as "The Power Plant".

History
The Mississippi Surge began play 2009 following the suspension of operations of the Mississippi Sea Wolves of the ECHL. The folding of the Sea Wolves left South Mississippi without a hockey team or a professional sports team. A new team was announced to begin play in 2009 and the team held a name-the-team contest on their temporary webpage.  On June 17, the Surge unveiled their name, logo, and colors. The team was to be coached by longtime Sea Wolves player and coach Steffon Walby.

The Surge had great success in its first season. After finishing first in the league at 34–14–8 at the end of the regular season, the Surge were presented the William B. Coffey Trophy as the regular season champions. The Surge advanced to the playoffs and faced the Columbus Cottonmouths in a series that they won 3–1. In the championship round the Surge were defeated by the Huntsville Havoc, sweeping the Surge 3–0. In addition to winning the William B. Coffey Trophy, the Surge also won many of the league's player awards. Steffon Walby was chosen as Coach of the Year, Steve Weidlich was chosen as Defenseman of the Year and was named team captain the following season, and Bill Zaniboni was chosen as the Goalie of the Year.

In the team's second year of operation, the Surge faced adversity with numerous injuries and call-ups of key players, but again managed to finish the season in first place with an overall record of 37–19. The Surge were again crowned the Regular Season Champions and received the 2010–11 William B. Coffey Trophy for the second year in a row. They played the Knoxville Ice Bears in the first round of the 2010–11 SPHL Playoffs and advanced to the President's Cup Finals after winning the series 3–2. In the SPHL Finals, the Surge were matched up against the second seed Augusta Riverhawks and swept the series 3–0 claiming their first President's Cup.

The Surge moved into their third year of operation under new ownership as the Pensacola Ice Flyers owner, Tim Kerr, bought the team from Coast Hockey LLC. Under new ownership, the Surge hired rookie head coach Jeff Bes. They went 29–24–3 in his first season.

During the off-season, Kerr informed fans that the team would need to reach 1,000 season ticket holders by the start of this season, to stay viable on the coast. He later had a meeting and told fans the number had been revised to 800 season ticket holders. Fans collaborated to achieve 816 season ticket holders. There was a counter visible to fans on the team's official website. The Surge have since removed the counter and it is not known how many season tickets have been sold.

On May 2, 2014, the Surge announced that they had officially suspended operations indefinitely and have since relocated to Roanoke to become the Rail Yard Dawgs.

Season records

*2010–11 season: no points were given for OTL

Championships and awards

Since the team's debut in the 2009–10 SPHL season, the Surge and its players won three different championship trophies and numerous player awards.

Championships

'11 President's Cup Champions roster

Head Coach: Steffon Walby
Player-Assistant: Steve Weidlich

Player Awards

2009–10 SPHL Goal-Tender of the Year: Bill Zaniboni
2009–10 SPHL Defenseman of the Year: Steve Wiedlich
2009–10 SPHL Coach of the Year: Steffon Walby

References

External links
Mississippi Surge
The Southern Professional Hockey League website
WAAY - New Havoc Opponent Causing Controversy
WKRG-Storm Surge vs Mississippi Surge

Defunct Southern Professional Hockey League teams
Ice hockey teams in Mississippi
Sports in Biloxi, Mississippi
Ice hockey clubs established in 2009
Ice hockey clubs disestablished in 2014
2009 establishments in Mississippi
2014 disestablishments in Mississippi